Carlos Bonilla Sánchez (December 26, 1979 in Santo Domingo, Dominican Republic) is the current Minister of Housing, Habitat and Buildings of the Dominican Republic under the presidency of Luis Abinader. Between 2020 until 2021 was director of the National Housing Institute (INVI). Bonilla Sánchez studied civil engineering and  graduated from the Instituto Tecnológico de Santo Domingo. He also got a  master's degree in Construction Management from Florida International University.

References 

Living people
1979 births
People from Santo Domingo
Government ministers of the Dominican Republic
Dominican Republic businesspeople
Santo Domingo Institute of Technology alumni
Florida International University alumni